The 2002 WNBA season was the 3rd and final season for the Portland Fire franchise. The team improved compared from their first two seasons, but playoff hopes were denied when they finished one game back for a playoff berth. The team later folded after the season.

Offseason

WNBA Draft

Regular season

Season standings

Season schedule

Player stats
Note: GP = Games Played; REB = Rebounds; AST = Assists; STL = Steals; BLK = Blocks; PTS = Points

References

Portland Fire seasons
Portland
Portland Fire